Hohe Loog may refer to the following places in Germany:

 Hohe Loog (Haardt), a mountain in the Haardt range near Neustadt an der Weinstraße
 a high point on the Eselsohler Berg
 part of the plain of Hohe Ebene near Neidenfels

See also

 Loog